Červený Kameň is a village and municipality in Ilava District in the Trenčín Region of north-western Slovakia.

Etymology
Both Slovak and Hungarian names mean "red stone". The first written mention about the village is "possesio seu willa Wewreskew" (1439). Cherweny Kamen (1484) later also Rothenstein (1808).

History
In historical records the village was first mentioned in 1439.

Geography
The municipality lies at an altitude of 361 metres and covers an area of 32.584 km². It has a population of about 757 people.

Genealogical resources

The records for genealogical research are available at the state archive "Statny Archiv in Bytca, Slovakia"

 Roman Catholic church records (births/marriages/deaths): 1671-1896 (parish A)

See also
 List of municipalities and towns in Slovakia

References

External links

 Official page
http://www.statistics.sk/mosmis/eng/run.html
Surnames of living people in Cerveny Kamen

Villages and municipalities in Ilava District